Hugh Smith (born 3 September 1839) was an Ontario farmer and political figure. He represented Frontenac in the Legislative Assembly of Ontario as a Conservative member from 1888 to 1894.

He was born in Portland Township, Frontenac County, Upper Canada in 1839, the son of William Smith, an Irish immigrant, and educated in Kingston. Smith served on the township council and was county warden from 1882 to 1888. He was elected to the provincial assembly in an 1888 by-election held after the death of Henry Wilmot.

External links 
The Canadian parliamentary companion, 1891 JA Gemmill

1839 births
Progressive Conservative Party of Ontario MPPs
Year of death missing